Portrait of a Humanist is a 1475–1480 oil on panel painting by Giovanni Bellini, showing Peter Luder. It is now in the Pinacoteca del Castello Sforzesco in Milan. It measures 35 cm by 28 cm.

1480 paintings
Humanist
Humanist